Jason Duehn Bohn (born April 24, 1973) is an American professional golfer who currently plays on the PGA Tour. He has won two PGA Tour events.

Amateur career
Bohn was born in Lewisburg, Pennsylvania. In 1992, while a sophomore on the Alabama golf team, Bohn was playing in a charity fund-raiser in Tuscaloosa when he made a hole-in-one worth $1 million. Bohn dropped his amateur status and golf scholarship on the spot and turned professional. He graduated from Alabama in 1995.

Professional career
While playing the Canadian Tour, Bohn shot a 58 in the final round to win the 2001 Bayer Championship. He also played the Nationwide Tour before earning promotion to the PGA Tour, where he has played since 2004. In 2005 he won the PGA Tour's B.C. Open.

During the 2009 season Bohn lost in a playoff at the Wyndham Championship along with Kevin Stadler to Ryan Moore.

In April 2010, Bohn won the 2010 Zurich Classic of New Orleans wire to wire, when he birdied three of the last four holes to win by two shots.

At the Greenbrier Classic in July 2015, Bohn shot a nine under par 61 during the third round that moved him from the cutline into the co-lead entering the final round. The round of 61 was Bohn's lowest ever career round on the PGA Tour. He also had his best FedEx Cup finish of 40th.

Professional wins (6)

PGA Tour wins (2)

PGA Tour playoff record (0–2)

Nationwide Tour wins (1)

Nationwide Tour playoff record (0–2)

Canadian Tour wins (2)

Other wins (1)

Results in major championships

CUT = missed the half-way cut
"T" = tied

Results in The Players Championship

CUT = missed the halfway cut
"T" indicates a tie for a place

Results in World Golf Championships

"T" = Tied
Note that the HSBC Champions did not become a WGC event until 2009.

See also
2003 Nationwide Tour graduates
2004 PGA Tour Qualifying School graduates

References

External links

American male golfers
Alabama Crimson Tide men's golfers
PGA Tour golfers
Korn Ferry Tour graduates
Golfers from Pennsylvania
Golfers from Georgia (U.S. state)
People from Lewisburg, Pennsylvania
Sportspeople from Cobb County, Georgia
1973 births
Living people